General elections were held in Northern Cyprus on 20 June 1976. Rauf Denktaş of the National Unity Party was elected President, with the National Unity Party also winning 30 of the 40 seats in the National Council.

Background
The Turkish invasion of Cyprus in 1974 had led to the establishment of the Turkish Federated State of Northern Cyprus. A referendum in June 1975 approved a new constitution, which provided for a presidential republic with a 40-seat unicameral National Council.

Results

President

National Council

References

Northern Cyprus
1976 in Northern Cyprus
Presidential elections in Northern Cyprus
Elections in Northern Cyprus
June 1976 events in Europe